Hambir Malla Dev (also known as Bir Hambir, Beera Hambeera, and Veer Hambir) was the forty-ninth king of Mallabhum. He ruled from 1565 to 1620 AD.

Personal life
Hambir was the 49th ruler of the Malla dynasty who flourished around 1586 AD and ruled in 16th-17th century, and was a contemporary of the Mughal emperor Akbar. He fought on the side of Akbar against the Afghans and paid an annual tribute to the Mughal governors of Bengal and thus acknowledged their suzerainty.

Bir Hambir was a pious man who started following Vaishnavism. A story in two Vaishnava works (Prem-vilasa of Nityananda Das (alias Balaram Das) and Bhakti Ratnakara of Narahari Chakrabarti) recounts the manner in which Srinivasa and other devotees were robbed by Bir Hambir while travelling from Vrindavan to Gaur with a number of Vaishanava manuscripts. However, Bir Hambir was so moved by Srinivasa’s reading of Bhagavata that he converted to Vaishnavism and gave Srinivasa a rich endowment of land and money. He introduced the worship of Madan Mohan to Bishnupur.

Dev Title
During his regime (1565 to 1620), Dev title was suffixed after title Malla and Mallabhum was very safe and secured.

Battle of Mundamala Ghat 
During the Pathan rule of Soleiman Karrani in Gaur, the kingdom of Bishnupur stood in a unique glory in the Rarh region of Bengal. His reckless son Daud Khan Karrani dreamed of seizing the whole of Bengal. In this situation, in 1575 AD, Daud Khan attacked Bishnupur with a large number of Pathan troops.
Revered Fakir Narayan Karmakar Mahasaya writes - "Dawood Khan suddenly came and encamped at a village called Ranisagar near Bishnupur with more than one lakh soldiers and similar ammunition."
 
The people of Ranisagar were embarrassed by the sudden attack of Dawood Khan's army of lakhs. The Bishnupur army was still not ready for battle. At this moment, the heroic prince of Bishnupur, Hambir Malla, started the war by arming the army. The army of Bishnupur, intoxicated with the dream of victory, proceeded to subdue the enemy by worshiping the Maa Mrinmayee, the kuladevi of Mallabhum.
 
The state of Bishnupur had total twelve forts, one of which was the Mundmal fort. Near this Mundmal Garh, the Mallabhum army attacked the Pathan forces. After a fierce battle between the two sides, Hambir Malla defeated the Pathan forces in such a tragic manner that the battlefield at the eastern gate of the fort was filled with the corpses of Pathan soldiers. The defeated Dawood Khan was taken prisoner. He waited for death in a state of siege. But the noble Hambir arranged for his release and reached a safe place.
 
"There were so many corpses of the dead Nawab's soldiers at the eastern gate of the fort that it was called" Mundmalaghat ".
 
It is said that Hambir Malla cut off the heads of the invading Pathan soldiers, made a garland (mundamala) and offered it as a gift to the demon-destroying Maa Mrinmayidevi. He was awarded the title of "Bir Hambir" for accomplishing that difficult task.

Rashmancha

The Rashmancha is a historical building located at Bishnupur. It was commissioned by Malla king Bir Hambir in 1600 CE. During the Vaishnava Ras festival, all the Radha Krishna idols of Bishnupur town used to be brought here to be worshipped by the citizens.

Dal Madal Kaman (Cannon)

During the reign of Bir Hambir the Dal Madal, one of the largest-bored cannons even made, was founded, demonstrating the skill of artisans of that time.  Dal Madal was made by Jagannath Karmakar. "Dal Madal" means "destruction of enemy". 

Another, eminent historian Maniklal Sinha writes, the well-known Dalmadal of the Malla Rajas. There are distinct critiques regarding the name of the cannon. Common people think that Dal and Madal are two cannons. The concept of Sanskrit-educated people is Dalmadal, came from Sanskrit name Dalmardan. However, each of the above thoughts is incorrect. Actually, Mallabhum, kingdom of Malla Rajas was dominated by Dharmathakura and a Dharamshila is known as Dalmadal. His study also suggests that the ancestor of the Karmakar family, Jagannath Karmakar who built the Dalmadal cannon and named the cannon as Dalmadal

See also
 History of Bankura district

References

Sources
website on Bankura
Kumkum Chatterjee. "Cultural flows and cosmopolitanism in Mughal India : The Bishnupur Kingdom" in Indian Economic and Social History Review Vol. 46 (2009), p. 147-182.
 
O’Malley, L.S.S., ICS, Bankura, Bengal District Gazetteers, pp. 21–46(25), 1995 reprint, first published 1908, Government of West Bengal

1620 deaths
Vaishnavism
Year of birth missing
Date of death missing
Kings of Mallabhum
Mallabhum temples
Artillery of India
16th-century Indian monarchs